This list of Colby College faculty includes current and former instructors and administrators of Colby College in Waterville, Maine, as well as a list of the 44 endowed faculty positions.  As of 2013, Colby employs 216 instructional faculty members, approximately 90% whom hold a doctorate or other terminal degree.

Arts and Humanities

Social Sciences

Sciences

Athletics

Other

References

External links 

Colby College faculty
Colby College faculty